The tenth studio album by German industrial band KMFDM, titled with a set of five unpronounceable, non-alphabetic symbols, 💥☠️💣🌀👊 (approximated using Emoji), and commonly known as Symbols, was released on September 23, 1997 by Wax Trax! Records.

Background
Recorded in Seattle, Washington, Symbols marked the introduction of Tim Skold. While his contribution to this album was as a guest, he would become a full-fledged member for Adios and Attak. Sascha Konietzko, the frontman of KMFDM, said the title had no special meaning, and was just an idea for a title the group had very early on, before a single album had been released.  En Esch said the idea for the album title came from the symbols used for curses in comic books. The symbols appear in the printed lyrics of "Down and Out"; the corresponding point in the song is covered with a censor-like beep in the song, and is replaced with "(SYMBOLS)" on the official KMFDM lyrics archive.

Release
Symbols was released on 23 September 1997.  "Megalomaniac", "Anarchy", and "Leid und Elend" were included on the soundtrack of the video game Test Drive 5. "Megalomaniac" was also featured in the film Mortal Kombat: Annihilation, and was the first single from its soundtrack. "Anarchy" appeared on the European version of the soundtrack to the 1998 film Lost in Space.

Reception

Andy Hinds of AllMusic gave a mixed review, calling some of the band's ideas repetitive while praising the programming. He also commented that the band keeps its sound fresh by bringing in new contributing artists for each new album, and noted the presence of Tim Skold and Nivek Ogre. He called the production top quality and the album "a fine place for newcomers to start," but said that Symbols offers people that have been following the band few surprises. Kevin Williams of the Chicago Sun-Times called "Megalomaniac" an "incredible, irresistible opener" and said the album "could result in a KMFDM takeover of electronica."

"Stray Bullet" received significant media attention after the Columbine High School Massacre due to the song's lyrics being posted on the website of one of the shooters, Eric Harris, before the massacre. The song was also played in the background of the final video posted by Pekka-Eric Auvinen on YouTube before the Jokela school shooting in Finland.

Track listing

Personnel
 Sascha Konietzko – sequences/programming/loops, vocals (1–6, 8, 10), drums (7, 8)
 En Esch – vocals (1–6, 8, 10), percussion (2, 7, 8), slide guitar (2), cymbals (4, 6), tambourine (4), guitar (6, 9), sequences/programming/loops (7–10), scratch piano (10)
 Günter Schulz – guitar, programming (2), loops (4, 9), backing vocals (6, 10), percussion (7, 8)
 Abby Travis – vocals (1, 2, 4, 7, 8, 10), bass guitar (6, 9)
 Michel Bassin – guitar (4, 7-9), percussion (7)
 William Rieflin – drums (6, 10), loops (7, 10), percussion (7), sequences (10)
 Raymond Watts – vocals (6, 9)
 Amy Denio – saxophones (8)
 Nivek Ogre – vocals (5)
 Tim Skold – vocals (7)

References

External links
 The lyrics of Symbols at the official KMFDM website

1997 albums
KMFDM albums
TVT Records albums
Metropolis Records albums